The Florida Underwater Archaeological Preserves are a system of underwater parks in the state of Florida, USA. They consist of shipwrecks of historic interest, both off the coast and inland, and are open all year round, free of charge. Similar programs have been created in California, Maryland, Michigan, New York, North Carolina, and Vermont.

There are eleven preserves in the Florida system:

 Urca de Lima
 San Pedro
 City of Hawkinsville
 USS Massachusetts (BB-2)
 SS Copenhagen
 SS Tarpon
 Half Moon
 Lofthus
 Vamar
 Regina
 Georges Valentine

References and external links
 The Underwater Archaeological Preserves
"The Spanish Treasure Fleets of 1715 and 1733: Disasters Strike at Sea", a National Park Service Teaching with Historic Places (TwHP) lesson plan
 Museums in the Sea

Archaeological sites on the National Register of Historic Places in Florida
Shipwrecks of the Florida coast
Shipwrecks on the National Register of Historic Places in Florida